Monarch High School (MHS) is a public high school located in Coconut Creek, Florida. Monarch is a part of the Broward County Public Schools system, and serves neighborhoods in: Coconut Creek, Deerfield Beach, Margate, and Pompano Beach.

Monarch had an FCAT school grade of "B" for the 2018-2019 and 2021-2022 academic years.

Campus
The pair of buildings that make up the school were designed by the Miami architectural firm Zyscovitch on a design and build basis. Building four, which houses the gym, cafeteria, and numerous classrooms, has the ability to be utilized as a hurricane shelter if necessary. The campus is also designed to enable community use of the facilities when not being used by the school.

During the school's third academic year, an additional building, Building 5, was constructed to relieve "critical overcrowding" and meet class size requirements. The school also has a number of portable classrooms. Currently MHS is trying to raise funds to build a football stadium on campus.

Excalibur Program
Monarch High School offers the Excalibur Program, an integrated and accelerated curriculum for talented students at Monarch. The program offers a rigorous curriculum consisting of high caliber classes, including those of the Honors, AICE, and AP level. Throughout the students' participation in the program, their inclusion depends upon GPA and test scores.

Academics

The school offers a large array of academic courses. The core academics include math, social studies, science, and English. There are many extra clubs and activities at the school, including (but not limited to) Drama Club, a wide variety of sports, a marching band, jazz band, concert band, drumline, indoor percussion, color guard, chamber orchestra, full orchestra, Debate Team, chorus, arts, step team, cheerleading, foreign language clubs, journalism club, flag football, multicultural society, an Environmental Club, Mu Alpha Theta, DECA, National Honor Society (NHS) and JROTC. Advanced Placement classes are offered also.

Monarch students presently attend school from 7:40 AM to 2:40 PM, Monday through Friday on Block schedule. The current schedule requires students to attend four classes out of eight each day and a 40-minute lunch period each day with an eight-minute passing period between each class.

The school has an online gradebook which allows students to check their grades from any computer connected to the internet. Other information, such as absences and missing assignments, can also be viewed.

2015 Academic Indicators

College Readiness Index 22.6

Mathematics Proficiency 2.7

Reading Proficiency 2.8

Student-Teacher Ratio 24:1

Sports

Test Scores 

U.S. News calculates these values based on student performance on state exit exams and internationally available exams on college-level course work (AP/IB exams).

Subject Proficiency Testing 

Student exit exams receive grades among multiple proficiency levels established by the state. These figures display how the school as a whole performed in different subjects.

Reading Proficiency Distribution 

Reading proficiency is determined by student results on the school's Florida Comprehensive Assessment Test or End-of-Course Assessments.

Mathematics Proficiency Distribution 

Mathematics proficiency is determined by student results on the school's Florida Comprehensive Assessment Test or End-of-Course Assessments tests.

Overall Student Performance 

This measures overall student performance on state exams. The calculations by U.S. News were the first of two steps in determining which schools received at least a bronze medal.

Disadvantaged Student Performance 

This measures the proficiency on state exams among typically underperforming subgroups. The calculations by U.S. News were the second of two steps in determining which schools received at least a bronze medal.

College-Ready Student Performance 

High school students take AP and IB exams to earn college credit and demonstrate success at college-level course work. U.S. News calculated a College Readiness Index based on exam participation rates and percentages of students passing at least one exam. The index determined which types of medals (gold, silver or bronze) were awarded to top-performing schools.

Advanced Placement (AP) Student Performance 

Many U.S. higher educational institutions grant credits or advanced placement based on student performance on AP exams. This shows this school's student participation and performance on these exams if data were available.

Data are based on the 2012-2013 school year.

Student Body

Class 

These details on the school's student body are based on data reported to the government.

Demographics

As of the 2021-22 school year, the total student enrollment was 2,406. The ethnic makeup of the school was 67.3% White, 23.9% Black, 40.1% Hispanic, 3.9% Asian, 3.5% Multiracial, 1% Native American or Native Alaskan, and 0.4% Native Hawaiian or Pacific Islander. 53.1% of the students were eligible for free or reduced cost lunch.

Digital Learning Environment 
At the beginning of the Digital Learning Environment program, in the school's second academic year (2004–2005), students were provided with a laptop that could be taken home and brought back with them to school on a regular basis to further enhance the program. This element was withdrawn after three years because of budget cuts, the expense of computer repairs and maintenance and because of misuse, vandalism and stolen/ lost computers.

Pinwheels for Peace
A program started by two teachers, Ellen McMillan and Ann Ayers at Monarch High, the Pinwheels for Peace Project invites students to create and display their pinwheels on the campus during the International Day of Peace and has been adopted internationally. Groups in more than 1,500 places have planted more than half a million pinwheels throughout the world.

Traditions

Knights Code of Chivalry
The school emphasizes a code of conduct among students, teachers, faculty and peers dubbed the "Knights Code of Chivalry." The code was created by a student panel the year before the school opened. Plaques containing the code are present in every classroom.

Responsibility
Citizenship
Kindness
Respect
Honesty
Self-Control
Tolerance
Cooperation

Notable alumni 

 Calvin Ridley (Class of 2015): American football wide receiver for the Jacksonville Jaguars

References

External

 Broward County Public Schools

Broward County Public Schools
High schools in Broward County, Florida
Public high schools in Florida
Coconut Creek, Florida
Educational institutions established in 2003
2003 establishments in Florida